In the United States, the use and possession of cannabis is illegal under federal law for any purpose by way of the Controlled Substances Act of 1970 (CSA). Under the CSA, cannabis is classified as a Schedule I substance, determined to have a high potential for abuse and no accepted medical use. Despite this, most states have legalized either or both the medical and recreational use of cannabis.

The medical use of cannabis is legal with a doctor's recommendation in 37 states, four out of five permanently inhabited U.S. territories, and the District of Columbia (D.C.). Eleven other states have laws that limit the psychoactive compound tetrahydrocannabinol (THC), for the purpose of allowing access to products rich in cannabidiol (CBD). Although cannabis remains a Schedule I drug, the Rohrabacher–Farr amendment prohibits federal prosecution of individuals complying with state medical cannabis laws.

The recreational use of cannabis has been legalized in 21 states, Guam, the Northern Mariana Islands, the U.S. Virgin Islands, and D.C. Another 10 states have decriminalized its use. Commercial distribution has been legalized in all jurisdictions where possession has been legalized, except for Virginia and D.C. Personal cultivation for recreational use is allowed in all of these jurisdictions except for Washington State and New Jersey.

Some cannabis-derived compounds have been approved by the Food and Drug Administration (FDA) for prescription use. Cannabinoid drugs which have received FDA approval are Marinol (THC), Syndros (THC), Cesamet (nabilone), and Epidiolex (CBD). For non-prescription use, CBD and delta-8-THC derived from industrial hemp are legal at the federal level, but legality and enforcement varies by state.

By state

Federal district

By inhabited territory

By tribal nation

Legalization timeline

See also 
 Cannabis and border towns in the United States
 Cannabis laws of Canada by province or territory
 Legal history of cannabis in the United States
 Legality of cannabis
 List of United States cannabis regulatory agencies
 Solomon–Lautenberg amendment ("Smoke a joint, lose your license" laws)
 Timeline of cannabis laws in the United States

Notes

References

External links
 State marijuana laws (NORML)
 State medical marijuana laws (NCSL)
 State recreational marijuana laws (ProCon.org)
 State industrial hemp laws (NCSL)

Cannabis law in the United States
Cannabis-related lists
Drug policy of the United States
Cannabis legality by jurisdiction